Salloon is a locality and townland in Magheracross civil parish, County Fermanagh, Northern Ireland. Salloon is in the Barony of Tirkennedy and is 222.08 acres in area. A large townland, Salloon takes in large areas of rural farmland but also includes about a third of the township of Ballinamallard.

Sallon has a rich history.

References

Villages in County Fermanagh
Townlands of County Fermanagh